Joseph Pembroke Thom (March 13, 1828 – August 21, 1899) was an American military officer and politician. He served in the United States Navy during the Mexican–American War and served in the American Civil War with the Confederate States Army. He served in the Maryland House of Delegates and as Speaker of the Maryland House of Delegates in 1884.

Early life
Joseph Pembroke Thom was born on March 13, 1828, at his family's "Berry Hill" estate in Culpeper County, Virginia to Abby de Hart (née Mayo) and Colonel John Watson Triplett Thom. Thom was taught skills at the estate and attended a log schoolhouse. He was the great-great grandson of William Mayo.

Thom was commissioned as lieutenant of the 11th Infantry Regiment at the outbreak of the Mexican–American War. He resigned his commission shortly after speaking with his father about his service. Thom then studied medicine under his brother, Dr. William Alexander Thom. He then studied medicine and graduated from the University of Virginia and Jefferson College in Philadelphia, Pennsylvania in 1851.

Career

Military career
Thom traveled to Washington, D.C. and appealed to President Polk to restore his commission. The President commissioned him second lieutenant under Captain William B. Taliferro. He served in the Mexican–American War, and was wounded at Puente Nacional and Huamantla. He remained in Mexico City after its capture. He then was on duty at Toluca and Veracruz. He developed yellow fever at Veracruz and was sent to Fort Hamilton in New York to recover. He then returned back to Virginia. He served on the USS Savannah for three years. He retired from the United States Navy after serving as surgeon.

Thom served on the staff of Taliferro during John Brown's raid on Harpers Ferry. He then ranked as colonel. Thom joined the Confederate States Army. He served in Virginia's "Irish Battalion". He participated in General Stonewall Jackson's Jackson's Valley campaign. He was wounded from a minié ball at the First Battle of Kernstown, but was protected by a copy of the Bible in his chest pocket. He was assigned the duty of transferring troops from Richmond. His physician ordered him to Bermuda and Thom ran the blockade from Charleston, South Carolina. Thom then moved to Canada and, in 1863, he was ordered to Italy to await completion of cruisers being built in France for the Confederacy. While abroad, the war ended, and he returned back to the United States in 1866.

Political career
Thom moved to Baltimore after returning from abroad.

In 1877, Thom was elected to the Baltimore City Council. Thom was elected to the Maryland House of Delegates, representing Baltimore, and served as Speaker of the Maryland House of Delegates in 1884. In 1897, Thom ran for the second district in the Maryland Senate, but lost to Lewis Putzel.

Thom was appointed to the board of management of a state hospital for children in Owings Mills, Maryland that he failed to pass legislation for while delegate. His son Pembroke Lea Thom followed him as delegate and passed legislation for the establishment of the hospital. He served as collector at the Port of Baltimore during the administrations of President Cleveland. He also served as trustee and was president of the board of Spring Grove Hospital Center for four years. Thom, alongside Dr. William T. Howard and Dr. H. P. C. Wilson, founded The Hospital for Women of Maryland.

Personal life
Thom married Ella Lea Wright on October 11, 1857. They had two sons, William H. DeCourcy and Pembroke Lea. His wife died in 1861. Thom married Catherine G. Reynolds of Kentucky in 1865 at Leamington Cathedral in England. They had two sons, Hunt R. Mayo and J. Pembroke Jr.

Thom owned a farm near Catonsville, Maryland where he raised Jersey cattle. Towards the end of his life, Thom lived at 828 Park Avenue in Baltimore. He was a vestryman of the Christ Protestant Episcopal Church in Baltimore. 

Thom died at his home in Baltimore on August 21, 1899. He was buried at Green Mount Cemetery in Baltimore.

References

External links
 
 Joseph Pembroke Thom (Maryland State Archives)
 Joseph Pembroke Thom Papers (Maryland Center for History and Culture

1828 births
1899 deaths
People from Culpeper County, Virginia
University of Virginia alumni
Washington & Jefferson College alumni
United States Navy personnel of the Mexican–American War
Participants in John Brown's raid on Harpers Ferry
Confederate States Army officers
People of Virginia in the American Civil War
Baltimore City Council members
Speakers of the Maryland House of Delegates
19th-century American physicians
Burials at Green Mount Cemetery